Yo Ho! Poor You, Little Me is an album by jazz saxophonist Frank Wess which was recorded in 1963 and released on the Prestige label.

Reception

The Allmusic site stated: "For those who were used to hearing Wess in the Basie band, it was a treat to hear him in a more intimate setting. A small group meant more improvising and more stretching out".

Track listing 
All compositions by Frank Wess, except where noted.
 "The Lizard" (Thad Jones) - 5:16   
 "Little Me" (Cy Coleman, Carolyn Leigh) - 5:12   
 "Yo-Ho" - 5:22   
 "Cold Miner" - 3:40   
 "Poor You" (Yip Harburg, Burton Lane) - 3:47   
 "The Long Road" - 9:51

Personnel 
Frank Wess - flute, tenor saxophone
Thad Jones - trumpet
Gildo Mahones - piano
Buddy Catlett - bass 
Roy Haynes - drums

References 

Frank Wess albums
1963 albums
Prestige Records albums
Albums produced by Ozzie Cadena
Albums recorded at Van Gelder Studio